Mercedes Sampietro Marro (born 24 January 1947) is a Spanish actress.

Biography 
Mercedes Sampietro Marro was born in Barcelona on 24 January 1947. She began her career as a stage actress in 1970. Having performed as a voice actress in a number of films, she made her film debut onscreen in Jaime Chávarri's To an Unknown God (1977). She has worked five times with Pilar Miró. In 1981 she won the award for Best Actress at the 12th Moscow International Film Festival for her role in Gary Cooper, Who Art in Heaven.

She won a Goya Award for Best Actress for her role in the 2002 Argentine-Spanish film Common Ground, performing Liliana Rovira, a social worker, daughter to Spanish Republican exiles who settled in Argentina.

She has dubbed actresses including Meryl Streep, Diane Keaton, Kim Basinger, and Catherine Deneuve.

Sampietro was the recipient of the 2003 National Cinematography Prize in Spain.

She served as the president of the Academy of Cinematographic Arts and Sciences of Spain from 9 October 2003 to 18 December 2006.

Filmography 
 2018
If I Hadn't Met You
 2007
La noche que dejó de llover
La buena nueva
El hombre de arena
Vida de familia
 2006
 Va a ser que nadie es perfecto
 53 días de invierno
 La edad de la peseta
 Salvador (Puig Antich), de Manuel Huerga
 2005
 Reinas, de Manuel Gómez Pereira
 Obaba, de Montxo Armendáriz
 Nordeste
 2004
 Inconscientes
 Febrer
 El año del diluvio (voz)
 Cuadrilátero
 2003
 Buscando a Nemo (voz)
 No matarás
 Bala perdida
 2002 – Lugares comunes
 2001 – Silencio roto, de Montxo Armendáriz
 2000
 Dinosaurio (voz)
 Nosotras
 Sé quién eres
 1999
 Cuando vuelvas a mi lado
 Las huellas borradas
 Tarzán (voz)
 Segunda piel
 Saïd
 1998 – Bert
 1997 – La herida luminosa
 1995 – Historias del Kronen, de Montxo Armendáriz
 1994 – Dame fuego
 1993 – El pájaro de la felicidad, de Pilar Miró
 1991 – Beltenebros (dubber of voice), de Pilar Miró
 1989
 Montoyas y tarantos
 La blanca paloma
 La banyera
 Caminos de tiza
 1988
 Sinatra
 Qui t'estima, Babel?
 Lluvia de otoño
 1987 – Pehavý Max a strasidlá
 1986
 Werther, de Pilar Miró
 Virtudes Bastián
 1985
 Extramuros
 El anillo de niebla
 1984 – La última rosa
 1983
 Percusión
 Vivir mañana
 1982
 Estoy en crisis
 Hablamos esta noche
 La leyenda del tambor
 El ser
 1980
 Gary Cooper, que estás en los cielos, de Pilar Miró
 El crimen de Cuenca, de Pilar Miró
 1978 – ¿Qué hace una chica como tú en un sitio como éste?
 1977 – A un dios desconocido

Awards and nominations

References

External links

Film actresses from Catalonia
1947 births
Living people
Stage actresses from Catalonia
Actresses from Barcelona
Best Actress Goya Award winners
Spanish voice actresses
20th-century Spanish actresses
21st-century Spanish actresses